Ever Since Eve is a 1934 American drama film directed by George Marshall and written by Stuart Anthony and Henry Johnson. The film stars George O'Brien, Mary Brian, Herbert Mundin, Betty Blythe, Roger Imhof and Russell Simpson. The film was released on March 25, 1934, by Fox Film Corporation.

Plot

Cast        
 George O'Brien as Neil Rogers
 Mary Brian as Elizabeth Vandergrift
 Herbert Mundin as Horace Saunders
 Betty Blythe as Mrs. Vandergrift
 Roger Imhof as Dave Martin
 Russell Simpson as Jim Wood
 George Meeker as Philip Baxter

References

External links 
 
 
 

1934 films
Fox Film films
American drama films
1934 drama films
Films directed by George Marshall
American black-and-white films
1930s English-language films
1930s American films